The 46th season of the Cuban National Series saw perennial powers Industriales and Santiago de Cuba meet in the playoff final, where the Avispas won the title, 4-2.

Pinar del Río and Santiago had the best regular season records, but the Vegueros were upset by La Habana in the first round of the playoffs.

Regular season standings

West

East

Playoffs

Statistical leaders

References

Baseball
Baseball
Cuban National Series seasons
Cuban National Series